Shadan College of Pharmacy an Indian school offering courses in pharmaceutical education situated in Peerancheru, Hyderabad. Started in 1994 by the Shadan Educational Society formed by Dr. Vizarath Rasool Khan, it offers undergraduate and post-graduate programmes in Pharmaceutical Sciences. The college is located in a  campus; it has well equipped laboratories, class rooms and other facilities as per the norms and standards of All India Council for Technical Education (AICTE) and Pharmacy Council of India (PCI). It is affiliated with Jawaharlal Nehru Technological University, Hyderabad. The College started M.Pharmacy (Pharmacology) Programme in the year 2005–06.

Shadan College of Pharmacy has been successful in providing and maintaining high quality in teaching and research in the pharmaceutical sciences.
Shadan Education Society Also Started the Pharm D(Doctor of Pharmacy) in 2016.

External links
Shadan College of Pharmacy

Educational institutions established in 1994
Pharmacy schools in India
Universities and colleges in Hyderabad, India
1994 establishments in Andhra Pradesh